Benjamín Berríos (born 9 March 1998) is a Chilean footballer who plays for Everton.

References

1998 births
Living people
Chilean footballers
Chilean Primera División players
Colo-Colo footballers
Everton de Viña del Mar footballers
Association football midfielders